The 24. edizione Mille Miglia  was an auto race held on a course totalling , made up entirely of public roads around Italy, mostly on the outer parts of the country on 11–12 May 1957. The route was based on a round trip between Brescia and Rome, with start/finish, in Brescia. It was the 3rd round of the 1957 World Sportscar Championship season.

As in previous years, the event was a race against the clock, as the cars were released at one-minute intervals. In the Mille Miglia, the smaller displacement, slower cars started first. Each car number related to their allocated start time. For example, Wolfgang von Trips's car had the number 532, he left Brescia at 5:32am, while the first cars had started late in the evening on the previous day. Some drivers went with navigators, others didn't; a number of local Italian drivers had knowledge of the routes being used and felt confident enough that they wouldn't need one.

This race was won by Scuderia Ferrari driver Piero Taruffi without the aid of a navigator. He completed the 992-mile distance in 10 hours, 27 minutes and 47 seconds- an average speed of 94.841 mph (152.632 km/h). The Italian finished 3 minutes in front of his second-placed team-mate, the German driver, von Trips. Olivier Gendebien and Jacques Washer were next, ensuring Scuderia Ferrari finished 1-2-3.

Report

Entry
A total of 391 cars were entered for the event, across 25 classes based on engine sizes, ranging from up to 750cc to over 2.0-litre, for Grand Touring Cars, Touring Cars and Sport Cars. Of these, 310 cars started the event. The limit on the number of starts was reduced from previous years. The Auto Club of Brescia took steps to try to combat the unsportsmanlike tactics by which some competitors sought to negate the procedure of drawing lots for departure times.

Even though the event continued to count towards the World Sportscar Championship, only Ferrari and Maserati entered works teams. Officine Alfieri Maserati was in receivership but still managed to have two 450Ss for Stirling Moss and Jean Behra, a brand new 350S for Hans Herrmann and older 300S for the Italian Giorgio Scarlatti. Meanwhile, Scuderia Ferrari entered four Sports cars, to be driven by Taruffi, von Trips, Peter Collins and Alfonso de Portago. They also entered Olivier Gendebien in a Grand Touring car. Britain was represented by a single semi-works Jaguar D-Type, entered by the Scottish team Ecurie Ecosse for Ron Flockhart.

One of the more unusual entrants was a Kurtis Kraft roadster for Akton Miller, a car constructed in the USA, with a powerful 6.4 litre Chrysler engine, mounted on a space-frame single seat chassis, designed for use on American oval circuits.

Race

Soon after the race started, Maserati's hopes vanished. Before the event even started, Behra was out, having crashed his 450S during pre-test. As for Moss, he was forced to retire soon after the start having rather dangerously snapped a brake pedal and Herrmann did not get as far as the Ravenna checkpoint.

In Guidizzolo, less than 40 miles from the finish in Brescia, de Portago's front tyre exploded. He lost control of the car; hit a telephone pole, jumped over a brook, hitting several spectators. The Ferrari then bounced back on the road, hitting more spectators, slid over the road, spinning, and ended up, wheels down, in a brook at the other side of the road. Besides de Portago, his American navigator Edmund Gunner Nelson, ten spectators – among them five children – lost their lives. A further 20 were injured. De Portago's body was found near the car, severed in half. Furthermore, Dutchman Joseph Göttgens crashed his Triumph TR3 near Florence and would die of his injuries in a Florence hospital.

When Taruffi arrived back in Brescia, he was dueling with von Trips but had a three-minute advantage over him due to a later start time. Gendebien finished third, completing a top three sweep for Ferrari. Maserati experienced a debacle with only Scarlatti arriving in Brescia in fourth place overall, followed 15 minutes later by the Porsche 550 RS of Umberto Maglioli. Taruffi reached Brescia after racing for 10 hours and 27 minutes after he left Brescia at 05:35.

Three days after the race, the Italian government decreed the end of the Mille Miglia and banned all motor racing on the public roads of Italy. Taruffi thus became the last winner of this famous event.

Classification

Official Results

Of the 310 starters, 172 were classified as finishers. Therefore, only a selection of notable racers has been listed below.

Class Winners are in Bold text.

Class Winners

Standings after the race

Note: Only the top five positions are included in this set of standings.Championship points were awarded for the first six places in each race in the order of 8-6-4-3-2-1. Manufacturers were only awarded points for their highest finishing car with no points awarded for positions filled by additional cars. Only the best 4 results out of the 6 races could be retained by each manufacturer. Points earned but not counted towards the championship totals are listed within brackets in the above table.

References

Further reading

Anthony Pritchard. The Mille Miglia: The World's Greatest Road Race. J H Haynes & Co Ltd. 
Leonardo Acerbi. Mille Miglia Story 1927-1957. Giorgio Nada Editore. 
Mille Miglia 1957: L'Ultimo Atto Di Una Corsa Leggendaria. Giorgio Nada Editore. 

Mille Miglia
Mille Miglia